Ignatz Gerard Kiefer, known as Nat G. Kiefer (February 26, 1939 – July 10, 1985) was an attorney from his native New Orleans, Louisiana, who served in both houses of the Louisiana State Legislature. He was a state representative from 1968 to 1970, and thereafter until his death in office fifteen years later a state senator.

Biography 
Kiefer ran unsuccessfully for Mayor of New Orleans in 1977, finishing third in the jungle primary by 242 votes to Councilman Joseph V. DiRosa, or less than a half a vote per precinct. DiRosa lost the runoff (general election) to Louisiana Court of Appeals Judge Ernest Morial, who became New Orleans' first black mayor.

Family
Kiefer married Carol Ann Hazard (born June 18, 1940); the couple had four children, Nat Gerard Kiefer, Jr., Kent Christopher Kiefer, Karen Anne Kiefer, and Kris Patrick Kiefer.

Death 
Kiefer died at the age of forty-six of a liver ailment at the University of California, Los Angeles Medical Center.

In 1987, the UNO Lakefront Arena was officially renamed the "Senator Nat G. Kiefer University of New Orleans Lakefront Arena".

References 

1939 births
1985 deaths
Democratic Party members of the Louisiana House of Representatives
Democratic Party Louisiana state senators
Politicians from New Orleans
Lawyers from New Orleans
20th-century American politicians
20th-century American lawyers